Sholden is a small village adjacent to the seaside town of Deal, lying on the road towards Sandwich in Kent, South East England.

History

It has previously been known as 'Soldone' and 'Scholdon'.

It has a Grade II* listed church, St Nicholas, which is in the diocese of Canterbury, and deanery of Sandwich. It also has a school, a cricket field and one public house, 'The Sportsman'.

It is the starting point of the Miner's Way Trail, a hiking trail linking up the coalfield parishes of East Kent.

Governance
Sholden is part of the electoral ward of Middle Deal and Sholden. The population of this ward at the 2011 Census was 7,414.

References

External links

 Sholden Action Group

Villages in Kent
Dover District
Civil parishes in Kent